The 2021–22 Major Arena Soccer League season is the fourteenth season for the league. The regular season started on November 26, 2021, and ended on April 3, 2022. Each team was scheduled to play a 24-game schedule. However, two Baltimore Blast games in December were cancelled due to the COVID-19 pandemic, and a Florida Tropics SC game at the end of the season was cancelled due to a Southwest Airlines outage preventing the visiting Blast from arriving.

Changes from 2021
Promoted to MASL from M2
Chihuahua Savage

Returning
Baltimore Blast
Harrisburg Heat
Milwaukee Wave
Utica City FC

Relegated to M2 from MASL
Turlock Cal Express

On Hiatus
Mesquite Outlaws
Monterrey Flash
Rochester Lancers

Folded
Soles de Sonora

Change in season format
On October 5, 2021, the MASL announced that teams will be divided into three divisions (Central, East, and West).
On October 15, 2021, the MASL announced the following changes for the 2021–22 season:
Standings will be based on a points system similar to the EISL's variant of the three points for a win system, where a regulation win receives 3 points, a regulation loss receives no points, an overtime or shoot-out win receives 2 points, and an overtime or shoot-out loss receives 1 point.
Division champions and the top five teams remaining advance to the playoffs, with the division champions seeded on top of the 5 wild cards.  Similar to last season, every playoff series will be a 2 game home and home series; if tied after 2 games, a 15 minute overtime period then, if necessary, a golden goal overtime period will follow the end of regulation of Game 2.

Standings
 
(Bold) Division Winner

Central Division

East Division

West Division

2022 Ron Newman Cup

References

External links
MASL official website

 
Major Arena Soccer League
Major Arena Soccer League
Major Arena Soccer League seasons